Japalak is a village in the city of Osh, Kyrgyzstan. Its population was 4,181 in 2021.

Population

References

Osh